Olav Bjørkaas (7 October 1914 – 3 January 2003) was a Norwegian politician for the Labour Party. He was mayor for Askøy from 1960 to 1967, and chair of the planning committee for and later the toll company for the Askøy Bridge from 1960 to 1974, and 1974 to 1993, respectively.

References

1914 births
2003 deaths
People from Askøy
Labour Party (Norway) politicians
Mayors of Askøy
20th-century Norwegian politicians